Casey Robert Parsons is a former Major League Baseball outfielder. In four seasons, he played in just 63 games, and in less than half of those (31) did he appear in the field. Parsons was used as a pinch hitter or pinch runner 48 times in those 63 games.

Parsons was born in Wenatchee, Washington, and he attended Gonzaga University, where he played college baseball for the Bulldogs from 1973 to 1976.

Following his Major League career, Parsons spent seven years as a manager in the Oakland Athletics organization. From  until , Parsons managed five different teams in the minors. His teams made the playoffs twice, losing in the first round each time.

References

External links

Major League Baseball outfielders
Seattle Mariners players
Chicago White Sox players
Cleveland Indians players
Great Falls Giants players
Fresno Giants players
Waterbury Giants players
Phoenix Giants players
Spokane Indians players
Salt Lake City Gulls players
Denver Bears players
Denver Zephyrs players
Louisville Redbirds players
Buffalo Bisons (minor league) players
Minor league baseball managers
Baseball players from Washington (state)
1954 births
Living people
Gonzaga Bulldogs baseball players
American expatriate baseball people in the Dominican Republic
People from Wenatchee, Washington